Radio Hades is a compilation album by the Illbient band Techno Animal, released on 21 September 1998 through Position Chrome. It comprises tracks from various compilation albums which have been edited and remixed for their release here.

NME described the album as "bold experiments from that shadowy borderland between instrumental hip-hop and avant-garde noise" and gave it a 6/10 rating.

Track listing

Personnel 
Techno Animal
Justin Broadrick – production
Kevin Martin – photography, design, production
Additional musicians and production
Don Ciccotelli – drums on "Return of the Venom"
Simon Heyworth – mastering

References 

1998 compilation albums
Techno Animal albums
Albums produced by Justin Broadrick